is a Japanese film director. He won the award for Best Director at the 9th Yokohama Film Festival for Chōchin.

Filmography
 Chōchin (1987)

References

External links

1944 births
Living people
Japanese film directors
People from Ibaraki Prefecture